Orlando City SC is an American professional soccer team based in Orlando, Florida, that competes in Major League Soccer (MLS).

This is a list of franchise records for Orlando, which dates from their inaugural MLS season in 2015 to present.

All stats accurate as of match played March 18, 2023.

Honors

Domestic 
U.S. Open Cup: 1
Winners: 2022

Player records

Appearances 
 Youngest first-team player: Thomas Williams –  (against Columbus Crew, MLS, April 16, 2022)
 Oldest first-team player: Donovan Ricketts –  (against D.C. United, MLS, May 14, 2015)
 Oldest first-team player (outfield): Kaká –  (against Columbus Crew, MLS, October 15, 2017)
 Youngest playoff appearance: Michael Halliday –  (against CF Montréal, October 16, 2022)
 Oldest playoff appearance: Nani –  (against Nashville SC, November 23, 2021)
 Youngest continental appearance: Michael Halliday –  (against Tigres UANL, CONCACAF Champions League, March 7, 2023)
 Oldest continental appearance: Nani –  (against Santos Laguna, Leagues Cup, August 12, 2021)

Most appearances
 Competitive, professional matches only.

USOC = U.S. Open Cup; Continent = Continental competitions include CONCACAF Champions League, Leagues Cup and Campeones Cup
Bolded players are currently on the Orlando City SC roster.

Goals
 Youngest goalscorer: Cyle Larin –  (against Portland Timbers, MLS, April 12, 2015)
 Oldest goalscorer: Kaká –  (against New England Revolution, MLS, September 27, 2017)
 Most goals in a season in all competitions: 18 – Cyle Larin, 2015
 Most League goals in a season: 17 – Cyle Larin, 2015
 Most goals scored in a match: 3
Carlos Rivas v Charleston Battery, U.S. Open Cup, June 17, 2015
Cyle Larin v New York City FC, MLS, July 26, 2015
Cyle Larin v New York Red Bulls, MLS, September 25, 2015
 Goals in consecutive league matches: 4 consecutive matches
Dom Dwyer, March 31, 2018 to April 22, 2018
Nani, April 6, 2019 to May 4, 2019
Daryl Dike, October 24, 2021 to February 27, 2022
 Fastest goal: 0 minutes 31 seconds – Tesho Akindele v FC Cincinnati, MLS, May 1, 2021
 Latest goal (not AET): 99 minutes 35 seconds – Kaká v Toronto FC, MLS, June 25, 2016
 Fastest hat-trick: 20 minutes 27 seconds – Carlos Rivas v Charleston Battery, U.S. Open Cup, June 17, 2015
 Most hat-tricks: 2 – Cyle Larin (July 26, 2015 to September 25, 2015)

Overall goals
 Competitive, professional matches only, appearances including substitutes appear in brackets.

USOC = U.S. Open Cup; Continent = Continental competitions include CONCACAF Champions League, Leagues Cup and Campeones Cup
Bolded players are currently on the Orlando City SC roster.

Goalkeeping 
 Youngest goalkeeper: Brandon Austin –  (against Toronto FC, MLS, June 19, 2021)
 Oldest goalkeeper: Donovan Ricketts –  (against D.C. United, MLS, May 14, 2015)

Most shutouts
 Competitive, professional matches only, appearances including substitutes appear in brackets.

USOC = U.S. Open Cup; Continent = Continental competitions include CONCACAF Champions League, Leagues Cup and Campeones Cup
Bolded players are currently on the Orlando City SC roster.

Team records

Record wins
Record MLS win:
6–1 vs New England Revolution, September 27, 2017
5–0 vs San Jose Earthquakes, June 22, 2021
Record U.S. Open Cup win: 5–1 vs New York Red Bulls, July 27, 2022
Record home win:
6–1 vs New England Revolution, MLS, September 27, 2017
5–0 vs San Jose Earthquakes, MLS, June 22, 2021
Record road win:
5–2 vs New York Red Bulls, MLS, September 25, 2015
4–1 vs Montreal Impact, MLS, September 7, 2016
3–0 vs Montreal Impact, MLS, June 1, 2019

Record defeats
Record MLS defeat:
0–5 vs Toronto FC, August 22, 2015
1–6 vs Philadelphia Union, October 22, 2017
0–5 vs New York City FC, July 25, 2021
Record MLS Cup Playoffs defeat:
1–3 vs New England Revolution, November 29, 2020
1–3 vs Nashville SC, November 23, 2021
0–2 vs CF Montréal, October 16, 2022
Record U.S. Open Cup defeat: 
1–3 vs Chicago Fire, July 22, 2015
1–3 vs Miami FC, June 14, 2017
0–2 vs Atlanta United, August 6, 2019
Record continental defeat: 0–1 vs Santos Laguna, Leagues Cup, August 12, 2021
Record home defeat:
1–4 vs Columbus Crew, MLS, September 17, 2016
0–3 vs New York City FC, MLS, May 21, 2017
2–5 vs Chicago Fire, MLS, October 6, 2019
0–3 vs New York Red Bulls, MLS, April 24, 2022
Record road defeat:
0–5 vs Toronto FC, MLS, August 22, 2015
1–6 vs Philadelphia Union, MLS, October 22, 2017
0–5 vs New York City FC, July 25, 2021

Highest scores 
Orlando City score listed first
 Highest scoring MLS game: 8 goals
3–5 vs New York City FC, July 26, 2015
3–5 vs D.C. United, July 4, 2022
 Highest scoring MLS Cup Playoffs game: 4 goals, 1–3 vs New England Revolution, November 29, 2020
 Highest scoring U.S. Open Cup game: 8 goals, 4–4 vs Charleston Battery, June 17, 2015
 Highest scoring continental game: 1 goal 0–1 vs Santos Laguna, Leagues Cup, August 12, 2021
 Highest scoring home game: 8 goals, 3–5 vs D.C. United, July 4, 2022
 Highest scoring road game: 8 goals
4–4 vs Charleston Battery, U.S. Open Cup, June 17, 2015
3–5 vs New York City FC, MLS, July 26, 2015

Streaks
 Longest unbeaten run (competitive matches): 12 matches, August 26, 2020 to October 24, 2020
 Longest unbeaten run (MLS): 12 matches, August 26, 2020 to October 24, 2020
 Longest winning streak (competitive matches): 6 matches, March 31, 2018 to May 13, 2018
 Longest winning streak (MLS): 6 matches, March 31, 2018 to May 13, 2018
 Longest tying streak (competitive matches): 4 matches, March 4, 2023 to March 18, 2023
 Longest tying streak (MLS): 3 matches
May 25, 2016 to June 25, 2016
June 4, 2017 to June 24, 2017
October 7, 2020 to October 24, 2020
August 4, 2021 to August 21, 2021
 Longest losing streak (competitive matches): 4 matches
July 11, 2015 to August 1, 2015
May 13, 2018 to June 6, 2018
July 18, 2018 to August 4, 2018
September 10, 2021 to September 29, 2021
 Longest losing streak (MLS): 9 matches, May 13, 2018 to July 14, 2018
 Longest streak without a win (competitive matches): 14 matches, July 18, 2018 to October 21, 2018
 Longest streak without a win (MLS): 13 matches, July 21, 2018 to October 21, 2018
 Longest scoring run (competitive matches): 17 matches, March 6, 2016 to July 4, 2016
 Longest scoring run (MLS): 15 matches, March 6, 2016 to July 4, 2016
 Longest scoreless run (competitive matches):  5 matches, September 8, 2018 to October 17, 2018
 Longest scoreless run (MLS):  5 matches, September 8, 2018 to October 17, 2018
 Longest streak without conceding a goal (competitive matches): 3 matches, February 25, 2023 to March 11, 2023
 Longest streak without conceding a goal (MLS): 3 matches, November 7, 2021 to March 12, 2022
 Longest streak without a shutout (competitive matches): 17 matches, June 9, 2018 to September 22, 2018
 Longest streak without a shutout (MLS): 22 matches, April 21, 2018 to September 22, 2018

Coaching records 

 First head coach: Adrian Heath – Heath was Orlando City's first head coach, staying with the team following their MLS expansion having also coached the previous incarnation to two USL Pro League titles.
 Longest-serving head coach: Óscar Pareja –  (112 matches) (December 4, 2019 to present)

List of seasons 

Source

Average MLS attendance

Individual honors

MLS Rookie of the Year

MLS All-Star

Transfer records
As per MLS policy, transfer fees are not disclosed and the figures shown are reported fees. Totals may also include allocation money.

In February 2017, MLS lifted its policy to not publicly disclose the figures of allocation money involved in intra-league trades, allowing for greater transparency. Prior to this, figures were either not known or reported by journalists but never official.

Highest transfer fees paid

Progression of record fee paid 
Amobi Okugo was one of the first players to be signed by the club using allocation money ahead of the inaugural 2015 season, costing a reported $100,000 from Philadelphia Union in December 2014. This figure was not reportedly surpassed until the arrival of David Mateos in July 2015 although the transfer of Bryan Róchez from Honduran club Real España in December 2014 was financially significant enough to be a Designated Player deal despite no figures ever being reported. In July 2017, Orlando set a record for a trade between two MLS teams when they sent $1,600,000 in allocation money to Sporting Kansas City for Dom Dwyer. A new club record was set in January 2018 when Orlando paid $3,000,000 to Paraguayan club Cerro Porteño for the transfer of teenager Josué Colmán. Colmán's fee stood as a record for four years until Orlando, under new ownership by the Wilf family, spent $9,000,000 on 21-year-old Uruguay international Facundo Torres.

Highest transfer fees received

Progression of record fee received 
The trade between Orlando City and Minnesota United for Kevin Molino in January 2017 was the first time Orlando had received a transfer fee: a total of $650,000 in allocation money. This was surpassed when Turkish club Beşiktaş negotiated a $2,300,000 fee for Cyle Larin in January 2018, the first draft pick in the club's history from the 2015 MLS SuperDraft. The record increased to $4,000,000 when Yoshimar Yotún was sold at the end of the 2018 season to Mexican club Cruz Azul. The current record is $9,500,000 set by the sale of another draft pick, Daryl Dike, who transferred to West Bromwich Albion in January 2022.

Designated players

Bolded players are currently on the Orlando City SC roster.

Homegrown players

Bolded players are currently on the Orlando City SC roster.

MLS SuperDraft picks
Below is a list of players Orlando City has selected in an MLS SuperDraft. A total of 31 players have been drafted by Orlando.

Bolded players are currently on the Orlando City SC roster.

Internationals
Below is a list of players capped internationally while with Orlando City and the number of caps they earned during that time. A total of 24 players have represented 13 different senior national teams during their Orlando City tenure. Players are listed according to the date of their first senior international appearance while under contract with Orlando.

Note: Countries indicate national team as defined under FIFA eligibility rules. Players may hold more than one non-FIFA nationality.

Bolded players are currently on the Orlando City SC roster.

Record by opponent

Major League Soccer
Orlando City joined MLS in 2015 and competes as a member of the Eastern Conference. The team qualified for the MLS Cup Playoffs for the first time in 2020 after failing to make the postseason the previous five seasons, snapping the joint second-longest MLS playoff drought in history at the time.

Regular season

During the 2020 season, Orlando competed in the MLS is Back Tournament. While the group stage games were counted towards the MLS regular season standings, the knockout round fixtures were not. The results of those games are listed below:

MLS Cup Playoffs

U.S. Open Cup
Orlando City has competed in the U.S. Open Cup since 2015. The team won the competition in 2022, the first trophy of their MLS era. The club's previous best result as a USL team was reaching the quarter-finals in 2013.

Continental

CONCACAF Champions League
Orlando City first qualified for the CONCACAF Champions League for the 2023 season having earned a berth as 2022 U.S. Open Cup champions.

Leagues Cup
Orlando City first qualified for the Leagues Cup for the 2021 season as one of the top two teams from each conference based on the 2020 regular season standings not scheduled to participate in the Champions League, marking the first time the club had qualified for any continental competition.

International friendlies
Additionally, Orlando City has featured in a number of friendlies against international opposition.

References

Orlando City SC
Orlando City
Orlando, Florida-related lists
Orlando City SC records and statistics